A name tag is a badge or sticker worn on the outermost clothing as a means of displaying the wearer's name for others to view.

Name tags may be temporary, such as a sticker with the iconic image being the "Hello!  My Name Is "; or it may be a more durable type. Temporary ones typically can be written upon so that the wearer's name may be handwritten or printed.  Permanent name tags are usually made of lightweight metal or plastic and may be known as name badges.

Name tags may be attached to garments with adhesive or worn with the assistance of a magnet, pin or velcro. Plastic or metal name tags can be attached to various backings used to attach to the clothing of the wearer. There are many types of name tag backings, including magnetic backings, locking pins, swivel clips, military clutch pins, alligator clips, and cell phone attachments. Magnetic backings, because they do not puncture clothing with pins, have recently become more popular for name tags. Some name tags are worn around the neck using a lanyard or necklace.

Name tags with magnetic backings pose a harmful threat to people who have pacemakers, as the magnet will interfere with the implant's normal function. It is suggested that people who have pacemakers use pinback backings with their name tags to avoid any disturbance with the pacemaker.

Name tags are used by some customer service companies, such as fast food restaurants, so that customers may identify employees by name. Professional employees or representatives of public-facing organizations such as universities, banks, or other companies where employees do not wear uniforms, may wear name tags as a way of distinguishing or identifying the bearer as such, while allowing the employee to wear daily business wear.

Military

Military personnel commonly wear name badges on their uniforms, though usually displaying only the family (last) name. However, there is not much emphasis on this formatting simply because of the plethora of cultures and naming conventions around the world. For example, in the Singapore Armed Forces, Indian last names are generally initialised and the first name spelt in full as last names can be quite a mouthful (hence serving functionality in nametags). With the large Chinese majority in Singapore, there have been contradictions in the convention, the most popular one being that the name be fully in initials save for the surname - spelt in full. 

The use of name tags probably originated with laundry tags, used to identify clothing belonging to particular individuals. During World War II the United States military began making use of external name tags, in particular on flight clothing and combat uniforms worn by marines and paratroopers. The use of cloth name tapes became common by the Korean War and its use spread to other armies. The Canadian Army began using cloth name tapes on the combat uniform introduced in the 1960s. During this period, the use of name tags extended from combat and work clothing only, to the dress uniform (and tags made of engraved plastic rather than cloth).

Other professionals
Police officers usually often wear name tags on their uniforms that are separate from the badges that identify their official capacity as a law enforcement officer.

So that nametags have a degree of privacy, nametags may be attached with velcro which can be easily changed.

Conventions

Loose associations of people gathering for conventions, and other events where socialization is encouraged, often wear name tags.

"Hello my name is" stickers 
"Hello my name is" stickers, first introduced by C-Line Products in 1959, became hugely popular. Many graffiti artists have been known to use these stickers as tags.

See also

References

External links

Badges
Identification
Stickers
Office equipment